Pasha's Mosque is one of six mosques in the city of Ulcinj, in Montenegro.

History
It was built by citizens of Ulcinj using goods from captured Venetian ships following an attack on Ulcinj by the Republic of Venice. The mosque was built in honour of admiral Kılıç Ali Paşa. This mosque also has a hamam, built before the mosque was completed. This hamam is the only hamam in Montenegro. The Friday khutbah is given in Arabic and Albanian language. It is located approximately 100m from the Sailor's Mosque.

See also 
 Ulcinj
 List of mosques in Ulcinj
 Sailor's Mosque

References

Mosques in Ulcinj
Ottoman architecture in Montenegro